Vindication may refer to:

 Vindication (horse) (2000–2008), American thoroughbred race horse
 Vindication (Crease album) (2000), third album of US hard rock band Crease
 Vindication (Susperia album) (2002), second album of Norwegian black metal band Susperia
 Vindication (film), 2008 film written and directed by Bart Mastronardi
 Vindication Island, small island in the southern Atlantic Ocean

See also
 Vindicated (disambiguation)